A Byzantine–Hungarian War was fought between Byzantine and Hungarian forces in the Balkans from 1180 to 1185. Taking advantage of the internal conflicts in the Byzantine Empire after Emperor Manuel's death, Béla III of Hungary reoccupied Croatia, Dalmatia and Syrmia, restoring Hungarian suzerainty over these territories after fourteen years.

Background
During the reign of Emperor Manuel I Komnenos (r. 1143–1180), Byzantium was a constant threat to Hungary's sovereignty along the southern border. The Balkans was a buffer zone between the two powers. The vassal state Grand Principality of Serbia rebelled in 1149, forcing Emperor Manuel to interrupt his preparations for an invasion of Southern Italy and invade Serbia in 1149. Manuel's active foreign policy in the Balkans escalated brief wars between the Byzantine Empire and the Kingdom of Hungary in the period between 1149 and 1155, during the reign of Géza II of Hungary.

Géza II died in May 1162. His fifteen-year-old son Stephen III ascended the Hungarian throne, but his two uncles, anti-kings Ladislaus II (1162–1163) then Stephen IV (1163), who had joined the court of the Byzantine Empire and enjoyed the support of Emperor Manuel, challenged his right to the crown. A civil war broke out between Stephen III and his uncles. The army of Stephen III, along with German mercenaries, defeated his uncle Stephen IV in June 1163. Although Stephen III remained the only legitimate monarch in Hungary, the civil war was followed by a large-scale Byzantine invasion of Hungary. Stephen III was obliged to renounce Syrmia (Sirmium) in favor of the Byzantine Empire, but only after Manuel promised that he would never support his uncle Stephen IV. Clashes and border conflicts between Hungary and the Byzantium lasted until 1167, when Stephen III had to renounce Dalmatia, Croatia and Syrmia to the Byzantine Empire. Prior to that, these lands belonged to the appanage of Stephen's younger brother Béla, who was sent to Constantinople in accordance with the peace treaty between Stephen III and Manuel. Béla ascended his brother in the Hungarian throne in 1172. Before his departure, he pledged that he would never make war against the Byzantine Empire. Until Manuel's death, no further confrontation took place between the two countries; Béla even sent reinforcements to Emperor Manuel to help him fight against the Seljuks in 1176.

The last Byzantine–Hungarian war
The death of Emperor Manuel on 24 September 1180 left the Byzantine Empire in an extremely difficult political situation. His eleven-year-old son Alexios II Komnenos succeeded him, but the imperial power was held by regents, his mother Maria of Antioch and the prōtosebastos Alexios Komnenos (a namesake cousin of the child monarch). The following period was characterized by internal struggles within the elite, while Manuel's daughter Maria Komnene (once engaged to Béla III) also contested her half-brother's right to the crown.

Recovery of the lost provinces
Taking advantage of the internal conflicts in the Byzantine Empire, Béla III launched a campaign in the autumn of 1180 in order to restore the Hungarian suzerainty in Dalmatia. The king entrusted his palatine Farkas Gatal to lead the Hungarian troops till the Adriatic Sea. Within six months, Béla had restored his suzerainty in Dalmatia, but no detailed contemporaneous accounts of the events exist. The citizens of Split and Zadar also accepted Béla's suzerainty in late 1280 or early 1181. The latter revolted against the Venetian rule, supported by the presence of the Hungarian army. Historian John V. A. Fine wrote that Béla retook suzerainty of Dalmatia "seemingly without bloodshed and with imperial consent", because the Byzantine authorities preferred that Béla rule the province rather than the Republic of Venice. Ferenc Makk refused this standpoint, because the "Byzantium was not threatened by Venice in Dalmatia at the time", for instance, Doge Orio Mastropiero unsuccessfully attempted to regain Zadar from the Hungarians years later, in 1187. Nevertheless, Béla indeed retook suzerainty of Dalmatia seemingly without serious confrontation. Farkas Gatal resided in Zadar in March 1181. Because of the internal struggle, the Byzantine Empire was unable to mount serious resistance. In addition, Kilij Arslan II, the Seljuk Sultan of Rûm seized most of the southern coast of Asia Minor from the empire around the same time.

Béla III immediately intended to reorganize the royal administration in Croatia and Dalmatia. His confidant Denis was installed as Ban of Slavonia in 1181. He was also styled as "Ban of Croatia and Dalmatia", then "governor of maritime parts" in 1183, and "Ban of Maritime Provinces" in 1184, which reflect he had jurisdiction over all Croatia and Dalmatia, and his suzerainty extended until the river Danube. Historian Judit Gál considered after Béla recovered Dalmatia, Hungary's territories beyond the Drava were initially consolidated under a single ban after 1183. Simultaneously with Denis' appointment, Maurus Győr was installed as "governor of the whole coastal province" already by February 1181, when resided in Zadar and was involved in a verdict about some possession rights. Accordingly, Maurus functioned as the deputy of Denis, supervising the coastal territories along the Adriatic Sea. King Béla also sought to re-establish pro-Hungarian ecclesiastical organization in Dalmatia: the 13th-century chronicler Thomas the Archdeacon narrates that the monarch wished the burghers of Split to elect a Hungarian national as archbishop of Split in order to fill the dignity. However, the citizens refused to elect the king's protegee and physician Peter and petitioned to the Holy See. In 1181, Pope Alexander III urged Béla III to respect the burghers of Split's privilege to free elect of their archbishop. Under the pressure of the Hungarians, despite the intervention of the Roman Curia, Peter was elected Archbishop of Split by the local citizens in 1185. Nevertheless, Peter already acted as de facto prelate in the previous years, and royal charters in Hungary styled him as Archbishop of Split since 1180.

Simultaneously with the recovery of Croatia and Dalmatia, the Hungarian army marched into Syrmia too, but the details of the reconquest of the province in the Central Balkans are also obscure. Béla's troops seized and ravaged the region of Belgrade and Barancs (now Braničevo in Serbia). It took place in the summer of 1181 at the latest. Andronikos Komnenos, marching to Constantinople with an army, accused Maria of Antioch, the mother and regent of the young Byzantine Emperor, Alexios II, of inciting Bélaher brother-in-lawto ravage the region of Belgrade and Barancs in May 1182, implying that Béla had by that time occupied Syrmia.

Interference in the Byzantine civil war

References

Sources

 
 
 
 
 
 

1180 in Europe
1181 in Europe
1182 in Europe
1183 in Europe
1184 in Europe
1185 in Europe
1180s in the Byzantine Empire
12th century in Hungary
Wars involving Hungary
Wars involving the Byzantine Empire
1180s conflicts